Abraham Galitzki or Abramius of Galich or Chukhlomsky and Gorodetsky (died  20 July 1375) was an abbot of the Russian Orthodox Church. He was a disciple of Sergius of Radonezh, and later went on to found four monasteries on Chukhloma Lake, in the Galich district of Kostroma Oblast.

Life and devotion
The birthplace and civil name of Abraham Galitzki are unknown. According to the excerpt from his hagiography, Galitzki originally worked in the Nizhny Novgorod Caves monastery, from where he moved to the Troitse-Sergieva Lavra. After some time, with the blessing of Sergius of Radonezh, Galitzki went to the Galich princedom, where he founded the first monastery in the Galich region, named Abrahamiev Novozaozersky in honor of the Dormition of the Most Holy Theotokos on the north-east shore of Galich Lake. In the legend of Galitzki it is said that he settled in the domain of Prince Dimitry of Galich, who possessed Galich in the years 1360-1363. Later Galitzki founded another three monasteries: one of them is Gorodets monastery in honor of the Protection of the Holy Virgin located on the northern shore of Lake Chukhloma.

Death
Galitzki died in the chapel near this monastery, where he retreated shortly before his death, about 1375. According to his legend, Galitzki died on July 20, 1375, but D.F. Prilutsky and Ye. E. Golubinsky believed that his death happened a little later, since prince Yuri Dimitrievich was named to be his contemporary, who received the Galich lands in 1389.

A stone Cathedral of Intercession of the Theotokos was built over the relics of Galitzki in 1608-1631, later after this monastery was ruined, in 1857–1867 over the relics of the Monk the cathedral was built in honor of the icon of the Mother of God Tenderness. In 1981, on the initiative 
of the Archbishop of Kostroma and Galich Cassian (Yaroslav) was founded Cathedral of the Kostroma saints, in which the name of Galitzki entered.

Canonization and veneration
Galitzki was twice canonized to local veneration - in 1553  and in 1621 (perhaps a diocesan celebration). The hagiography of Galitzki was compiled in 1548-1553 by abbot of Gorodets monastery  Protasy who took the old monastic records about the saint as a basis.

He is venerated as a saint in the Russian Orthodox Church, with a feast day of July 20.

References

External sources
Holweck, F. G. A Biographical Dictionary of the Saints. St. Louis, MO: B. Herder Book Co. 1924.
Repose of the Venerable Abramius of Galich or Chukhom Lake, and Disciple of the Venerable Sergius of Radonezh, Orthodox Church in America.
 Д.Ф. Прилуцкий (Prilutsky). Историческое описание Городецкого Авраамиева монастыря в Костромской губернии // Преподобный Авраамий Городецкий, Чухломской и Галичский чудотворец и созданный им Свято-Покровский Авраамиево-Городецкий монастырь.(Historical description of Gorodets Abrahamiev monastery in Kostroma region// St. Abraham Gorodetsky, Chuhlomsky and Galitzki wonder-worker and Gorodets monastery founded by him) Moscow, 1996, p. 145-156
 Е.Е. Голубинский (Yevgeny Golubinsky). История канонизации святых в Русской Церкви. (The history of canonization of Saints in Russian church) Moscow, 1903; reprint: Moscow, 1998, p. 11
 Н. А. Зонтиков, Э. Н. И. Авраамий Галичский. Православная энциклопедия (Abraham Galitzki. Orthodox encyclopedia), vol. 1, p. 173-175

14th-century Christian saints
Year of birth missing
1375 deaths
Russian saints
Russian Orthodox monks
Russian saints of the Eastern Orthodox Church
Russian Orthodox Christians from Russia